The 1977 Venezuelan motorcycle Grand Prix was the first round of the 1977 Grand Prix motorcycle racing season. It took place on 20 March 1977 at the San Carlos Circuit.

500cc classification

350 cc classification

250 cc classification

125 cc classification

References

Venezuelan motorcycle Grand Prix
Venezuelan
Motorcycle Grand Prix